Johannes Lodewijk Nicolaas "Jan" Schaefer (16 March 1940 – 30 January 1994) was a Dutch politician and community organiser who served as State Secretary for Housing and Spatial Planning from 1973 to 1977 under Joop den Uyl's cabinet. He was a member of the Communist Party of the Netherlands (CPN) until 1965, before he joined the Labour Party (PvdA) in 1969. Schaefer was first elected to the House of Representatives in the 1971 general election, where held a seat with interruptions until 1990. He also served as an alderman in the municipal executive of Amsterdam from 1978 to 1986, in charge of housing.

Legacy
Bridge 2000 or Jan Schaeferbrug in Amsterdam's Eastern Docklands, built from 1999 to 2001, was named after him in 2000. Jan Schaeferpad, a street in Amsterdam-Zuidoost, also bears his name since 2000.

References

External links

Official
  J.L.N. (Jan) Schaefer Parlement & Politiek

1940 births
1994 deaths
Aldermen of Amsterdam
Bakers
Communist Party of the Netherlands politicians
Community activists
Dutch cooperative organizers
Deaths from diabetes
Dutch trade unionists
Labour Party (Netherlands) politicians
Members of the House of Representatives (Netherlands)
Municipal councillors of Amsterdam
State Secretaries for Housing and Spatial Planning of the Netherlands
20th-century Dutch politicians